Parasparopagraho Jīvānām (Sanskrit: परस्परोपग्रहो जीवानाम्) is a Jain aphorism from the Tattvārtha Sūtra [5.21]. It is translated as "Souls render service to one another". It is also translated as, "All life is bound together by mutual support and interdependence." These translations are virtually the same (by virtue, that is), because Jains believe that every living being, from a plant or a bacterium to human, has a soul and the concept forms the very basis of Jainism.

Motto of Jainism
The aphorism Parasparopagraho Jīvānām has been accepted as the motto of Jainism. It stresses the philosophy of non-violence and ecological harmony on which the Jain ethics and doctrine—especially the doctrines of Ahimsa and Anekantavada—are based. This motto is inscribed in Devanagari script at the base of the symbol of Jainism which was adopted by all sects of Jainism while commemorating the 2500th anniversary of nirvana of Mahavira.

Jain declaration of Nature
The noted Indian Jurist and Jain leader, Laxmi Mall Singhvi in his famous "Jain declaration of Nature", notes:

The extent of all life being bound together by mutual support and interdependence may also be put into context among the first known postulations for the existence of unseen microbial life and atomic particles, by the Jains.

References

Mottos
Jain philosophy